Strange Faith and Practice is the seventh album by American-born singer/songwriter Jeb Loy Nichols, released in 2009 on Impossible Ark Records.

Track listing
"Sometime Somewhere Somebody" - 2:59
"Lake Whitfield" - 4:14
"The Day That Never Came" - 4:10
"Can't Stay Here" - 4:39
"This Morning" - 3:10
"Probably Never Stop" - 3:05
"Interlude One" - 2:03
"Strange Faith and Practice" - 4:36
"If I Can Come Home to You" - 4:41
"Interlude Two" - 3:15
"Cruel Winter" - 2:39
"Home Wasn't Built in a Day" - 5:43
"Next Time" - 3:43

Reception

Nichols' seventh release received positive reviews. Allmusic said "this is the most organic-sounding record Nichols has ever made -- and that's saying something, because all of his previous offerings have been warm and intimate.'  The Independent said "this foray into drifting, downtempo jazz is a wonderful and surprising departure, the 13-song sequence of Strange Faith & Practice deepening as it goes."

References

2009 albums
Jeb Loy Nichols albums